Private members' clubs are organisations which provide social and other facilities to members who typically pay a membership fee for access and use. Some were originally elitist gentlemen's clubs to which members first had to be elected; others are more modern commercial establishments with no class or gender bar, typically offering food, drink, comfortable surroundings, venue hire and business facilities, in return for members paying subscription or membership fees.

History
The first gentlemen's clubs, mostly established in the West End of London from the late 17th century onwards, were highly exclusive, offering aristocratic and wealthy men a refuge from work and family. The eligibility of potential members depended on their class and gender, with women banned from joining any of them. Early clubs also provided an environment for gambling, illegal outside of members-only establishments. Individuals needed to be formally proposed for membership, and candidates were subject to election by committees which scrutinised individuals' character and suitability.

Several private members' clubs for women were established in the late 19th century; among them the Alexandra Club, the Ladies' Institute, the Ladies' Athenaeum and the University Women's Club. Many of the traditional gentlemen's clubs now allow women as members, though a few, including the Garrick Club in London's Covent Garden, still refuse women membership.

More modern but otherwise similar private members' clubs have since been established. London examples include the Groucho Club (established in 1985), Soho House (1995) and Home House (1998); similar clubs operate in other cities and countries: for example, the CORE Club was established in New York City in 2005. These typically offer memberships by subscription and are owned and run as commercial concerns. They offer similar facilities such as food, drink, comfortable surroundings, venue hire and in many cases accommodation. Mobile working (using phone and email) had put pressure on traditional London clubs, some of which discouraged use of mobiles and laptops, or discussion of business matters. By contrast, business-oriented private members' clubs combine the style, food and drink of a contemporary private members' club with the business facilities of a serviced office or coworking space.

Examples
Notable examples of private members' clubs include:
the CORE Club, New York City
the Groucho Club, London
Home House, London
Soho House, London

References

Clubs and societies